Simon Slater (born 1959) is a British music director, composer, narrator, and actor. He has composed more than 300 original music scores for film, theatre, TV and radio, and is a member of the British Academy of Composers and Songwriters.

In 2010, Slater's narration of Wolf Hall by Hilary Mantel won two awards; an Audie Award for Literary Fiction and an AudioFile magazine Earphone Award. For best sound designer in the 2013 play Constellations, he was nominated an Olivier Award.

Early life and education

Simon Slater was born in Filey Road, Scarborough, North Riding of Yorkshire, the son of a sailor known as the Prospect Of Whitby yachtsman Arthur Slater. As a young child he became inspired by his music teacher at Bramcote School. In 1972, he joined Sedbergh School, where he was a student until 1977. Growing up in Scarborough, he lived not far from the Stephen Joseph Theatre, where his parents took him to see plays by Alan Ayckbourn. Later, he gained admission to Goldsmiths College at the University of London.

Career
Slater has composed more than 300 original music scores for film, theatre, TV and radio, which have included BBC Radio 3, Channel 5, and West End theatre productions. He is a member of the British Academy of Composers and Songwriters. 

For three years he worked as a composer on the plays Henry V and Julius Caesar for the Royal Shakespeare Company. He wrote the music for Macbeth, starring Sean Bean and  wrote the music for The Blood Libel for Radio 4.  

He also composed for many productions at Hampstead Theatre Club, The Liverpool Everyman,Bristol Old Vic, the Bush Theatre, and Young Vic.

Television
Slater has appeared in several TV series, including Heartbeat, Inspector Morse, Hotel Babylon, Monarch of the Glen, and as Inspector Kite in The Bill. He also appeared in Birds of a Feather, Doctor Who,  Lovejoy, and Where the Heart Is.

Theatre

At the Stephen Joseph Theatre he was invited to compose the music for four actor-musicians in the Christmas adaptation of Pinocchio in which they play an array of instruments covering 30 roles. The production ended in 2016. Other Christmas shows he directed music for at the SJT include A Christmas Carol and Alice in Wonderland.

Slater also wrote or co-wrote the songs for Christmas shows Cinderella at Theatre Royal, Winchester, The Santa Trap for The Cliffs Pavilion, Southend, and Little Red Riding Hood at the Chelsea Theatre.

His work as a theatrical actor includes a five-year run in the musical Mamma Mia! as Sam Charmichael, as well as Forbidden Broadway (Fortune), Sugar Hill Blues (Hampstead and Warehouse Croydon), The Great White Hope (Tricycle), Aspects of Love (Sydmonton Festival), Waiting for Godot, and Wind in the Willows (Nuffield Southampton). He appeared in the Theatre Royal (Winchester) production of Peter Pan the Pantomime playing Captain Hook during the Christmas season of 2010/2011. He also wrote all the music for the show.

In 2016 he was musical director for Amadeus at the Royal National Theatre.

Music
He plays piano, double bass, saxophones, clarinet, guitar, piano accordion, ukulele, and mandolin.

He has written the musical score to the aerial show, 'Zoetrope' which is being produced by the theatre company Kinematic Theatre. The show debuts at Rose Bruford College's Rose theatre in late September. Simon has also written music for the Royal Shakespeare company and other London Theatres, including work at Sloane Square Theatre, The Royal Court.

Film
In the film The Iron Lady, Slater played the role of Chris Patten.

Audio
In 2010, Slater's narration of Wolf Hall by Hilary Mantel won an Audie Award for Literary Fiction. and an AudioFile magazine Earphone Award.

In 2018, he read Hans Rosling's Factfulness: Ten Reasons We're Wrong About the World – and Why Things Are Better Than You Think.

Filmography

Film

Television

Stage

Radio

Awards and nominations

References

External links

English male television actors
English male musical theatre actors
English male stage actors
Alumni of Goldsmiths, University of London
1959 births
Living people
Actors from Scarborough, North Yorkshire
People educated at Sedbergh School
Audiobook narrators
Music directors
British male composers